54th New York Film Critics Circle Awards
January 15, 1989

Best Film: 
 The Accidental Tourist 
The 54th New York Film Critics Circle Awards honored the best filmmaking of 1988. The winners were announced on 15 December 1988 and the awards were given on 15 January 1989.

Winners
Best Actor:
Jeremy Irons - Dead Ringers
Runners-up: Dustin Hoffman - Rain Man, Tom Hanks - Big and Gene Hackman - Mississippi Burning
Best Actress:
Meryl Streep - A Cry in the Dark
Runners-up: Jodie Foster - The Accused, Melanie Griffith - Working Girl and Carmen Maura - Women on the Verge of a Nervous Breakdown (Mujeres al borde de un ataque de nervios)
Best Cinematography:
Henri Alekan - Wings of Desire (Der Himmel über Berlin)
Runners-up: Sven Nykvist - The Unbearable Lightness of Being and Jörgen Persson - Pelle the Conqueror (Pelle erobreren)
Best Director:
Chris Menges - A World Apart
Runners-up: Clint Eastwood - Bird, Wim Wenders - Wings of Desire (Der Himmel über Berlin) and Lawrence Kasdan - The Accidental Tourist
Best Documentary:
The Thin Blue Line
Best Film:
The Accidental Tourist
Runners-up: A World Apart and Dead Ringers
Best Foreign Language Film:
Women on the Verge of a Nervous Breakdown (Mujeres al borde de un ataque de nervios) • Spain
Runner-up: Au Revoir Les Enfants • France/West Germany/Italy
Best Screenplay:
Ron Shelton - Bull Durham
Runners-up: Shawn Slovo - A World Apart and Frank Galati and Lawrence Kasdan - The Accidental Tourist
Best Supporting Actor:
Dean Stockwell - Married to the Mob and Tucker: The Man and His Dream
Runners-up: Alec Guinness - Little Dorrit, Martin Landau - Tucker: The Man and His Dream and Tim Robbins - Bull Durham
Best Supporting Actress:
Diane Venora - Bird
Runner-up: Jodhi May - A World Apart

References

External links
1988 Awards

1988
New York Film Critics Circle Awards, 1988
New York Film Critics Circle Awards
New York Film Critics Circle Awards
New York Film Critics Circle Awards
New York Film Critics Circle Awards